This page details the qualification process for the 2009 U.S. Open Cup.

The tournament proper features teams from the top five levels of the American Soccer Pyramid. These five levels, namely Major League Soccer, the United Soccer Leagues (First Division, Second Division, and Premier Development League), and the United States Adult Soccer Association, each have their own separate qualification process to trim their ranks down to their final eight team delegations in the months leading up to the start of the tournament proper. It is expected that eight teams from each level will compete in the tournament proper, with the eight clubs from MLS receiving byes into the Third Round.

The qualifying process for MLS will take the form of an eight-team play-off tournament. The top six finishers, regardless of conference, in 2008 were given six of the berths into the Third Round. The eight remaining U.S.-based clubs will compete for the final two berths via a playoff.

Continuing the format of recent seasons, no qualification process will be needed for USL-1 and USL-2 as each level has exactly eight U.S.-based clubs for the 2009 season. The PDL has announced that selected early season games will again double as qualifying matches, as they had in recent years. Each conference will be given two berths that will be awarded to the best team in each division.

The qualifying process for the USASA will take the form of four regional tournaments. Assuming the continuation of recent seasons' format, the two finalists in each region will be awarded berths.

Tier 1: Major League Soccer (MLS)

Bracket

Schedule
Note: Scorelines use the standard U.S. convention of placing the home team on the right-hand side of box scores.

Qualification Semifinals

Qualification Finals

D.C. United qualify for the Third round.

Seattle Sounders F.C. qualify for the Third round.

Tier 2: USL-1 and Tier 3: USL-2
No qualification is necessary for USL-1 and USL-2 since each level has eight U.S.-based clubs for the 2009 season.

Tier 4: USL Premier Development League (PDL)
Winners in each division advance to tournament
All teams play 4 designated games doubled as regular season games 
Green indicates U.S. Open Cup berth clinched

Central Conference

Great Lakes Division

Heartland Division

Eastern Conference

Mid Atlantic Division

Northeast Division

Southern Conference

Mid South Division

Southeast Division

Western Conference

Northwest Division

Southwest Division

*-maximum goal differential of +/- 3 per game

Tier 5: United States Adult Soccer Association (USASA)

Region I 

Nine teams will compete for the two Region I berths in the U.S. Open Cup.

Bracket

Preliminary Round

Qualification Semifinals

Qualification Finals

Region II 
Seven teams have qualified from Illinois, Michigan, Wisconsin, Nebraska, Indiana and Iowa.

Region III 
The following teams have qualified for the regional finals to be held in St. Johns, Florida from May 22 to 25, 2009.

Group A
Lynch's Irish Pub F.C. (Florida)   
Pumas FC (NPSL - Alabama) 
Baton Rouge Classics (Louisiana)
Greenwood Wanderers (South Carolina)

Group B
Dynamo New Tampa  (Florida)
Legends F.C. (North Texas)
Rocket City United (NPSL - Alabama)
Atlanta FC (NPSL - Georgia) 

Group A

*Greenwood Wanderers failed to show, so all games were 3–0 forfeits

Group B

*Dynamo New Tampa failed to show, so all games were 3–0 forfeits

Final

Region IV 
The following teams participated in the regional finals to be held in Scottsdale, Arizona from May 15 to 17, 2009.

Group A
Doxa-Italia (Southern California)   
F.C. Hasental (Southern California) 
San Diego United (on hiatus from NPSL)
Sonoma County Sol (on hiatus from NPSL)

Group B
All Sol F.C.  (New Mexico)
Arizona Sahuaros (on hiatus from NPSL)
Miran F.C. (Southern California)
Rockstar United (Arizona) 

Group A

Group B

Final

*Miran F.C. was disqualified for using illegitimate players, so the group runner up (Arizona Sahuaros) will participate in the U.S. Open Cup

See also 

qualification